The  is a partially tolled expressway in Sorachi Subprefecture and Rumoi Subprefecture, Hokkaido, Japan. The expressway connects Rumoi on the Sea of Japan coast of Hokkaido to the Dō-Ō Expressway in the central part of the island. It is owned and operated by partially by the East Nippon Expressway Company and the Ministry of Land, Infrastructure, Transport and Tourism (MLIT). It is signed as an auxiliary route of National Route 233 as well as E62 under their "2016 Proposal for Realization of Expressway Numbering.

History

The first section of the Fukagawa-Rumoi Expressway to open was a  section between its eastern terminus at Fukagawa Junction on the Dō-Ō Expressway to Fukagawa-nishi Interchange on 11 April 1998. The expressway was completed with the extension of its route west from Rumoi-Owada Interchange to Rumoi Interchange on 28 March 2020.

Junction list
The entire expressway is in Hokkaido.

References

Expressways in Japan
Roads in Hokkaido